József Horváth (born 21 May 1949) is a Hungarian former footballer.

Career
Horváth played for Újpest FC and Rot-Weiss Essen, and in the North American Soccer League between 1978 and 1981 for the Rochester Lancers, Washington Diplomats and San Jose Earthquakes.

He played at the international level for Hungary. Horváth also spent time in the American Soccer League, United Soccer League, and played indoor soccer in both the NASL and Major Indoor Soccer League.

References

External links
 NASL career stats
 Újpest Profile 
 

1949 births
Living people
Footballers from Budapest
American Soccer League (1933–1983) players
Buffalo Stallions players
Hungarian footballers
Hungarian expatriate footballers
Hungary international footballers
Major Indoor Soccer League (1978–1992) players
New Jersey Rockets (MISL) players
North American Soccer League (1968–1984) players
North American Soccer League (1968–1984) indoor players
Pennsylvania Stoners players
Rochester Flash players
Rochester Lancers (1967–1980) players
Rot-Weiss Essen players
San Jose Earthquakes (1974–1988) players
Újpest FC players
United Soccer League (1984–85) players
Washington Diplomats (NASL) players
Hungarian expatriate sportspeople in West Germany
Hungarian expatriate sportspeople in the United States
Expatriate footballers in West Germany
Expatriate soccer players in the United States
Association football midfielders
Hungarian expatriate football managers
Expatriate soccer managers in the United States
American Soccer League (1933–1983) coaches
Player-coaches